Dana Kerem (born 11 September 1986) is an Israeli football defender currently playing in the Ligat Nashim Rishona for ASA Tel Aviv University, with which she had also played in the Champions League. She was a member of the Israeli national team during the 2007 World Cup qualifying. She made her debut on 21 August 2005 against Estonia.

Club career
Kerem started her career at the age of 14, joining Maccabi Tel Aviv. In 2002, after Maccabi Tel Aviv had folded, Kerem joined ASA Tel Aviv University, where she played until 2006.
In summer 2006, Kerem joined Temple Owls, where she played for one season, before returning to ASA Tel Aviv University.

In her second tenure at ASA Tel Aviv, Kerem won with the club five championships and three cups, and represented the club in UEFA Women's Champions League, playing a total of 17 matches for the team between 2010 and 2014.

International career
Kerem made her debut in the Israel women's national football team in 2005 against Estonia and played two other matches in the 2007 World Cup qualification. On 19 June 2014, after 8 years of absence, Kerem made a return to the national team, in a match against Denmark.

Kerem also played for the U-19 national team, making 12 appearances between 2002 and 2005.

Honours
Championships (5):
 2009–10, 2010–11, 2011–12, 2012–13, 2012–13
Cup (3):
 2010–11, 2011–12, 2013–14

References

External links
 
 

1986 births
Living people
Israeli women's footballers
Israel women's international footballers
Maccabi Tel Aviv F.C. (women) players
ASA Tel Aviv University players
Women's association football defenders